Bulgarian Democratic Center ( – an acronym for "Bulgarian Democratic Center"), formerly (Lider – Liberal Initiative for Democratic European Development) is a Bulgarian political party registered in 2007.

Participation in elections
Lider participated in the 2009 European Parliament election together with the center-right political party Novoto Vreme and gathered 5.7% of the vote, which was just under the electoral quota. Lider participated in the 2009 parliamentary election outside of any right-wing coalition, winning only 3.3% of the votes and therefore failing to secure parliamentary representation.

Lider did not nominate a candidate for the 2011 presidential election.

In the 2013 parliamentary elections Lider polled 61,482 (1.74%) votes. Once again the party failed to cross the 4% threshold for representation.

References

External links
 

Conservative parties in Bulgaria
Liberal parties in Bulgaria
Political parties established in 2007
Pro-European political parties in Bulgaria
2007 establishments in Bulgaria